

Events

Men's singles

Women's singles

Men's doubles

Women's doubles

Mixed doubles

See also
ITTF World Tour
ITTF World Tour Grand Finals

External links
ITTF World Tour
ITTF Statistics

medalists
ITTF World Tour Grand Finals
ITTF World Tour Grand Finals
ITTF World Tour Grand Finals